Arabic month names are the Arabic-language names for months in a number of different calendars.
 Arabic names of Gregorian months
 Months of the Islamic calendar
 Pre-Islamic month names

See also
 Gregorian calendar
 Islamic calendar
 Pre-Islamic Arabian calendar

Months